Pavonina is a genus of foraminifers in the family Pavoninidae.

References 

Rotaliida genera